The 2019 Turkish Basketball Presidential Cup was the 35th edition of the Turkish Basketball Presidential Cup. The game was played between Anadolu Efes, champions of the 2018–19 Basketbol Süper Ligi, and Fenerbahçe Beko, the winners of the 2019 Turkish Cup.

Anadolu Efes won their 12th championship in their 23rd final appearance, while Fenerbahçe played a total of 16 President's Cup finals and won only 7 of them.

Venue

Match details 
Krunoslav Simon, who had 22 points (he shot 6/6 behind 3 point line), 3 rebounds and 2 assists in the game, was named the Presidential Cup MVP.

References

External links
Official Website 
Turkish Basketball Federation (TBF) Official website 

Presidents Cup
2019
Turkish Cup 2019